The Major League Soccer Player of Month is a monthly soccer award given to players in Major League Soccer. The honor is given to the player deemed to have had the best cumulative performance in each month by a panel of journalists from the North American Soccer Reporters organization. The award was formerly voted on by the Professional Soccer Reporters Association.

Since 2014, the award has been sponsored by Etihad Airways and named the Etihad Airways Player of the Month.

Winners

2022

2021

2020

2019

2018

2017

2016

2015

2014

2013

2012

2011

2010

2009

2008

2007

2006

2005

2004

2003

2002

2001

2000

1999

1998

1997

1996

References

Major League Soccer trophies and awards
Association football player of the month awards